Un viaggio chiamato amore (internationally released as  A Journey Called Love) is a 2002 Italian romance-drama film directed by Michele Placido.

It tells the tormented relationship between the writer Sibilla Aleramo and the poet Dino Campana.

The film entered the 59th Venice International Film Festival, where Stefano Accorsi was awarded with the Volpi Cup for best actor.

Cast
 Laura Morante: Sibilla Aleramo
 Stefano Accorsi: Dino Campana
 Alessandro Haber: Andrea
 Galatea Ranzi: Leonetta

References

External links
 
 A Journey Called Love Review

2002 films
Italian romantic drama films
Romantic drama films based on actual events
Films directed by Michele Placido
2002 romantic drama films
2000s Italian-language films
2000s Italian films